Everlast is an American brand of sports equipment, focused on boxing, mixed martial arts and physical fitness, which markets its products worldwide. The company was founded in The Bronx and is currently based in Manhattan. In 2007, Everlast was acquired by the British retailing group Frasers Group.

Everlast manufactures a wide range of products for fight sports including boxing gloves, protective gear (head and body protectors, mouthguards, jockstraps, hand wraps), punching bags, punch mitts, boxing rings (and corner stools, canvas, ropes, corner cushions). The company also markets a clothing and footwear line including T-shirts, sleeveless shirts, hoodies, leggings, shorts, pants, compression garment, and sneakers.

History 
In 1910, 17-year-old Jacob Golomb, the son of a tailor and an avid swimmer, started the company as a manufacturer of swimwear designed to last longer than previously available swimsuits; he guaranteed his suits would last longer than one year, and named them "Everlast". Everlast expanded into supplying a wide range of sports equipment. The company first produced boxing gear in 1917 after a young Jack Dempsey asked them to supply him with headgear that would last for more than 15 rounds. It subsequently sponsored Roberto Durán, Joe Frazier, Marvin Hagler, Larry Holmes, Sugar Ray Leonard, and in particular Muhammad Ali and became the most recognizable boxing brand.

Golomb died in the 1950s and was succeeded as head of the company by his son Daniel, who made the Everlast logo on the company's boxing gloves larger to increase visibility on television. Ben Nadorf purchased 50% of Everlast Sports Mfg. Corp in 1958 and became sole owner in 1995. In 2000, the company was acquired by George Horowitz's Active Apparel Group, which had manufactured men's and women's sportswear under license for Everlast, and in 2007, Sports Direct acquired Everlast Worldwide.

The company has expanded its activities into MMA and has been awarded the World MMA Awards for Best Technical Equipment Brand five times, most recently in 2016.

Everlast boxing equipment is made in a factory in Moberly, Missouri; other products are manufactured outside the US by licensees. The company also made boxing equipment at a factory in the Port Morris section of the Bronx from the 1980s until 2003.

Media 
Everlast is responsible for the production and syndication of a number of podcasts, including The Fight Cave MMA Podcast, Talkbox, In Fighting Shape, Protect Yourself at all Times, and Evolving Athletes.

In 1993, an Everlast in the form of a chastity belt, was worn by Maid Marian in Robin Hood: Men in Tights.

See also

 Lonsdale (clothing)
 Mixed martial arts clothing

References

External links 

 

Companies based in New York City
Clothing companies established in 1910
Sporting goods manufacturers of the United States
Sportswear brands
Manufacturing companies established in 1910
1910 establishments in New York City
Sports Direct
Port Morris, Bronx
2007 mergers and acquisitions